Sadist is the fifth full-length studio album by the Italian progressive death metal band Sadist, released on April 17, 2007 by Beyond Productions. This release marks Sadist's return not repeating styles from their last release but taking their musical styles back to the "Tribe era". The album features Claudio Simonetti from the band Goblin on the title track.

Track listing
Lyrics by Trevor Nadir.  Music by Sadist.
 "Jagriti" (instrumental) − 2:30
 "One Thousand Memories" − 4:55
 "I Feel You Climb" − 3:59
 "Embracing the Form of Life" − 4:59
 "Tearing Away" − 3:47
 "Kopto" (instrumental) − 3:33
 "Excited and Desirous" − 4:41
 "Different Melodies" − 5:10
 "Invisible" − 3:29
 "Hope to Be Deaf" − 5:19
 "Sadist" (instrumental)− 2:33

Personnel

Sadist
 Trevor − Vocals
 Tommy − Acoustic and Electric guitars, Mandolin, Bouzouki, Keyboards, Piano
 Andy − Bass
 Alessio − Drums

Additional Personnel
Paolo Marchini: Strings on tracks 2 and 6
Claudio Simonetti: Keyboards and arrangements on track 11
Dado Sezzi: Additional Percussion

References

Sadist (band) albums
2007 albums
Season of Mist albums